Budarino is a rural locality (a selo) and the administrative center of Budarinsky Selsoviet, Limansky District, Astrakhan Oblast, Russia. The population was 591 as of 2010. There are 11 streets.

Geography 
Budarino is located 24 km southeast of Liman (the district's administrative centre) by road. Dalneye is the nearest rural locality.

References 

Rural localities in Limansky District